Dravidogecko anamallensis, also known as the Anamalay gecko, Anaimalai dravidogecko, or Anamalai Hill gecko, is a species of gecko found in the South Indian hills of Palni, Anamalai and Tirunelveli. It is assigned to the genus Dravidogecko, with a resurrection in 2019, as a study suggested molecular phylogenetics is to have had a separate origin from the other Hemidactylus species.

References

Further reading
 Bauer, Aaron M. & Anthony Patrick Russell. 1995. The systematic relationships of Dravidogecko anamallensis (Günther 1875). Asiatic Herpetol. Res. 6: 30–35.
 Boulenger, G.A. 1885. Catalogue of the Lizards in the British Museum (Nat. Hist.) I. Geckonidae, Eublepharidae, Uroplatidae, Pygopodidae, Agamidae. London: 450 pp.
 Günther, A. 1875. Second report on collections of Indian Reptiles obtained by the British Museum. Proc. Zool. Soc. London, 1875: 224–234.

External links
 

Dravidogecko
Reptiles described in 1875
Taxa named by Albert Günther